Flynn Glacier is a glacier about  long, draining eastward from Mount Nares in the Churchill Mountains of Antarctica, and entering Starshot Glacier south of Kelly Plateau. It was named by the Advisory Committee on Antarctic Names for Commander William F. Flynn (CEC), U.S. Navy, commanding officer Mobile Construction Battalion, Special Detachment Bravo, at McMurdo Sound, winter 1957.

References 

Glaciers of Oates Land